Gil Antônio Moreira (Itapecerica, October 5, 1950) is the Archbishop of the Roman Catholic Archdiocese of Juiz de Fora, Minas Gerais state, Brazil, since Jan 28, 2009.

He is the national head of the Terço dos Homens (Men's Rosary) movement, according to the Brazilian Episcopal Conference (CNBB).

References

20th-century Roman Catholic bishops in Brazil
1950 births
Living people